Binge & Purgatory is the fifth studio album by Australian hardcore band Deez Nuts. It was released on April 7, 2017 through Century Media and Sony Music Entertainment. The album debuted at number 46 on the ARIA Albums Chart.

Track listing

Personnel
Deez Nuts
JJ Peters – vocals
 Matt Rogers – guitars
Sean Kennedy – bass, vocals
Alex Salinger – drums
Slim - backing vocals
Burke - backing vocals
RB - backing vocals
SK - backing vocals
Goose - backing vocals
Production
 Andrew Neufeld – production
 Shane Frisby – production, engineering
 Peter Rutcho – mastering, mixing

Charts

References

2017 albums
Deez Nuts (band) albums
Century Media Records albums